The Man out of the Rain is a collection of crime short stories by Philip MacDonald.

Contents
 Dream No More, first published in Ellery Queen's Mystery Magazine, November 1955; winner of 1956 Edgar Award for the best short story
 The Go-Between
 The Man out of the Rain, first published in Ellery Queen's Mystery Magazine, September 1954
 Ten O’Clock, first published in Creeps by Night, ed. Dashiell Hammett, John Day, 1931
 The Elephant’s Head
 His Mother’s Eyes, first published in Tales of Mystery, ed. Ernest Rhys & C.A. Dawson-Scott, Hutchinson, 1927

Publication history
1955, USA, New York, Doubleday Crime Club,  OCLC: 1381749, Hardback
1957, UK, London, Herbert Jenkins, OCLC: 3867653, Hardback

1955 short story collections
American short story collections
Crime short story collections